Ye Cracke is a pub in Rice Street off Hope Street in Liverpool, England. The name is in Old English: the "Y" is a thorn and the "e" on the end of "Cracke" is silent, thus the name is correctly pronounced "The Crack". Despite the name, Ye Cracke is a 19th-century pub. The "War Office" is a small room in the pub, which is the oldest part of the pub.

It has historical connections with The Beatles because it was frequented by John Lennon and his girlfriend Cynthia when they were at art school, as well as the Dissenters, to whom a plaque hangs in the bar.

Thomas Cecil Gray and John Halton conceived the techniques described in their 1946 book A Milestone in Anaesthesia while in the pub.

References

Pubs in Liverpool